Occipital branch may refer to
Occipital branch of posterior auricular artery
Occipital branches of occipital artery
Occipital branches of posterior auricular nerve